Juraj Skákala (born 4 December 1995) is a Slovak male wildwater and slalom canoeist who competes in C2 together with Matúš Gewissler.

In canoe slalom he competed at the junior and under-23 level in the C2 class from 2011 to 2018, when the discipline was discontinued.

He was 6th in the C2 sprint senior final at the 2019 Wildwater Canoeing World Championships.

Achievements

References

External links
 

1995 births
Living people
Slovak male canoeists
Place of birth missing (living people)